In Zapotec cultures of Oaxaca (southern Mexico), a muxe (also spelled muxhe) is a person assigned male at birth who dresses and behaves in ways otherwise associated with women; they may be seen as a third gender.

Etymology
The Zapotec word  is thought to derive from the Spanish word for "woman", . In the 16th-century, the letter x had a sound similar to "sh" (see ).

Gender and identity in Zapotec culture
In contrast to Mexico's majority mestizo culture, the Isthmus of Tehuantepec has a predominantly Zapotec population, one of the country's indigenous peoples. It is widely reported that muxe face less hostility there than  homosexual, effeminate males, and trans women do elsewhere in Mexico. One study estimates that 6 percent of males in an Isthmus Zapotec community in the early 1970s were muxe. Other Zapotec communities, outside the Isthmus, have similar third gender roles, such as the biza’ah of Teotitlán del Valle.

Some marry women and have children while others choose men as sexual or romantic partners. According to anthropologist Lynn Stephen, muxe "may do certain kinds of women’s work such as embroidery or decorating home altars, but others do the male work of making jewelry".

Muxe may be vestidas ("dressed", i.e. wearing female clothes) or pintadas ("painted", i.e. wearing male clothes and make-up). It has been suggested that while the three-gender system predates Spanish colonization, the phenomenon of muxe dressing as women is fairly recent, beginning in the 1950s and gaining popularity until nearly all of the younger generation of muxe today are vestidas.

Within contemporary Zapotec culture, reports vary as to their social status. Muxe in village communities may not be disparaged and highly respected, while in larger, more Westernised towns they may face some discrimination, especially from men, due to attitudes introduced by Catholicism. Muxe generally belong to the poorer classes of society. Gender variance and same-sex desire in wealthier communities of the region are more likely to follow a more western taxonomy of gay, bisexual and transgender. Such individuals are also more likely to remain "in the closet". Despite this, muxe have traditionally been considered good luck, and many now have white-collar jobs or are involved in politics.

Anthropologist Beverly Chiñas explained in 1995 that in the Zapotec culture, "the idea of choosing gender or of sexual orientation is as ludicrous as suggesting that one can choose one's skin color." Most people traditionally view their gender as something God has given them (whether man, woman, or muxe), and few muxe desire genital surgery. They generally do not suffer from gender dysphoria.
There is not as much pressure to "pass" as in Western societies.

Lynn Stephen writes: "Muxe men are not referred to as "homosexuals" but constitute a separate category based on gender attributes. People perceive them as having the physical bodies of men but different aesthetic, work, and social skills from most men. They may have some attributes of women or combine those of men and women." If they do choose men as sexual partners, neither are necessarily considered homosexual.

Prominent individuals
In 2003, 25-year-old Amaranta Gómez Regalado from Juchitán de Zaragoza gained international prominence as a congressional candidate for the México Posible party in the Oaxaca state elections. Her broad platform included calls for the decriminalization of marijuana and abortion.

Lukas Avendaño is an emerging performance artist whose recent work constitutes a queer performatic intervention of Mexican nationalistic representations, particularly that of Zapotec Tehuana women. Avendaño, born on the Isthmus, embodies the complex identity of muxes. His cross-dressing performance interweaves ritual dances with autobiographical passages and actions that involve audience members, in order to challenge the widely-held view of a gay-friendly indigenous culture and point towards the existence of lives that negotiate pain and loneliness with self-affirming pride.

Marven is a food vendor often referred to by her business name Lady Tacos de Canasta. Her first notable appearance was a viral video taken while she was selling food at Marcha del Orgullo Gay 2016, a Pride parade. Since then, she has grown in popularity and been featured on multiple media outlets. She was featured in Episode 3 of Taco Chronicles, the 2019 Netflix documentary series, in which she discusses both her business and gender. She was involved in multiple reported incidents with police in February and July 2019.

See also
 Bakla, a similar group of people in the Philippines
 Blossoms of Fire (2000), a documentary film about the people of Juchitán, Oaxaca.
 Femminiello, a similar group of people in Naples, Italy
 Hijra, a group of people with similar traits in India
 Third gender
 Sexuality and gender in Zapotec Oaxaca

References

Further reading
 
 "Meet the Muxes. How a remote town in southern Mexico reinvented sex & gender", Fusion, May 31, 2015, http://interactive.fusion.net/meet-the-muxes/ (includes videos).
 Lacey, Marc "A Lifestyle Distinct: The Muxe of Mexico" The New York Times, December 7, 2008
 Roscoe, Will (1998). Changing Ones: Third and Fourth Genders in Native North America. New York: St. Martin's Press.

External links
ExandasDocs. "Muxes of Juchitán". Time 9:47. YouTube.com, Sept. 4, 2007.
CNN.com. "The Muxes of Mexico - Part 1". Time 8:38. May 11, 2010.
CNN.com. "The Muxes of Mexico - Part 2". Time 8:13. May 11, 2010.
CNN.com. "The Muxes of Mexico - Part 3". Time 6:31. May 11, 2010.
vice.com. "OAXACA'S THIRD GENDER". Time 22:21. July 9, 2013.
"Born this way: the Mexican town where gender is fluid" (also hosted on Youtube and on Vimeo), a short documentary released in October 2017, directed by Shaul Schwarz, produced by Reel Peak Films, and commissioned by The Guardian and The Filmmaker Fund, interviews several residents of Juchitán and their family members about the experiences and perceptions of muxes.  Spanish with English subtitles.

Gender in Mexico
Gender systems
Mexican culture
 
Oaxaca
Third gender
Transgender in North America
Zapotec civilization